This is a list of the members of the Tasmanian Legislative Council between 1903 and 1909. The terms of the Legislative Council did not coincide with Legislative Assembly elections, and members served six year terms, with a number of members facing election each year.

Elections

Members

Notes
  On 7 February 1904, William Hart, one of the two members for Launceston, died. Charles Russen won the resulting by-election on 3 May 1904.
  On 4 March 1905, John Watchorn, the member for Huon, died. Thomas Fisher won the resulting by-election on 2 May 1905.
  On 29 November 1905, William Gibson, one of the three members for Hobart, died. William Propsting won the resulting by-election on 22 December 1905.

Sources
 
 Parliament of Tasmania (2006). The Parliament of Tasmania from 1856

Members of Tasmanian parliaments by term
20th-century Australian politicians